Sierra Leone have competed in ten Commonwealth Games, first attending in 1958. They did not attend in 1962 or 1974, then took a twelve-year break between 1978 and 1990. They have not yet won a Commonwealth Games medal.

References

 
Nations at the Commonwealth Games